Matthew 28:19 is the nineteenth verse of the twenty-eighth chapter of the Gospel of Matthew in the New Testament. This verse is part of the Great Commission narrative, containing the command to go, teach and baptize new disciples with the trinitarian formula.

Content
The original Koine Greek, according to Westcott and Hort/[NA27 and UBS4 variants], reads:
19: πορευθέντες οὖν μαθητεύσατε πάντα τὰ ἔθνη, βαπτίζοντες αὐτοὺς εἰς τὸ ὄνομα τοῦ πατρὸς καὶ τοῦ υἱοῦ καὶ τοῦ ἁγίου πνεύματος,

In the King James Version of the Bible it is translated as:
19: Go ye therefore, and teach all nations, baptizing them in the name of the Father, and of the Son, and of the Holy Ghost:

The modern World English Bible translates the passage as:
19: Go, and make disciples of all nations, baptizing them in the name of the Father and of the Son and of the Holy Spirit.

Analysis

The word "all" is found multiple times in the verses 18–20, tying them together: all power/authority, all nations, all things ("that I have commanded you") and all the days ("always"). "All nations" comprises 'non-Jews as well as Jews'. 

In Joshua 1:2, Joshua was commanded to 'go' (cf. Just as Moses, at the end of his life on earth, commissioned Joshua to 'go into the land peopled by foreign nations' and 'to observe all the commandments in the law', then further promised 'God's abiding presence', so similarly Jesus, at the end of his earthly ministry, commands his disciples 'to go into all nations' (the world) and 'to teach the observance of all the commandments' of the "new Moses", and then further promises 'his continual assisting presence'.

The word "therefore" ties Jesus' universal authority (verse 18) to the words of the commission: because Jesus now has this authority, therefore he sent his disciples to go spreading his rule over all nations by making more disciples; the disciples can go in confidence that their Lord/Master is 'in sovereign control of "everything in heaven and on earth"' (cf. Romans 8:28).

The phrase "in the name of" denotes 'to whom allegiance is pledged in baptism', which is tied to the unique trinitarian formula: "the Father and of the Son and of the Holy Ghost/Holy Spirit".

Use in early Christianity

Some early Christian writings appealed to Matthew 28:19. The Didache, written at the turn of the 1st century, borrows the baptismal Trinitarian formula found in Matthew 28:19. The seventh chapter of the Didache reads "Having first said all these things, baptize into the name of the Father, and of the Son, and of the Holy Spirit". In addition, Tertullian, writing around the turn of the 2nd century, also cites the bapstismal Trinitarian formula from this Matthean passage twice in his writings. In the 26th chapter of his Against Praxeas, arguing against a Unitarian understanding of God, Tertullian cites this formula, writing "He commands them to baptize into the Father and the Son and the Holy Ghost, not into a unipersonal God." In addition, in the 13th chapter of Tertullian's On Baptism, he cites the formula in order to establish the necessity of the practice of baptism, writing "For the law of baptizing has been imposed, and the formula prescribed: "'Go,' He says, 'teach the nations, baptizing them into the name of the Father, and of the Son, and of the Holy Spirit.'"

See also
Gloria Patri

Notes

References

Sources

Matthew 28
Holy Spirit